Donald Bruce Dingwell  (born 1958) is a Canadian geoscientist who is the director of the Department of Earth and Environmental Sciences and Ordinarius for Mineralogy and Petrology of the Ludwig Maximilian University of Munich. He is also currently vice-president of the Academia Europaea. From September 2011 to December 2013 he was the third and last secretary general of the European Research Council (ERC) where he embarked on a global participation campaign for the ERC. He is also a past-President of the European Geosciences Union and the current past-president of the International Association of Volcanology and Chemistry of the Earth's Interior (IAVCEI), founded in 1919.

Career
Dingwell was born in Corner Brook, Newfoundland, Canada. He began his research career at the Carnegie Institution of Washington (now Carnegie Institution for Science) where he was a Carnegie Fellow from 1984 to 1986 working at the Geophysical Laboratory. His first permanent (tenure-track) appointment was to the University of Toronto as assistant professor. In 1987 he moved to the newly founded Bavarian Institute of Experimental Geochemistry and Geophysics (Bavarian Geo-institute) at the University of Bayreuth where he served as assistant to the founding Director Friedrich Seifert. Dingwell has been based at his present position as Professor of Mineralogy and Petrology in the Faculty of Geosciences of the Ludwig Maximilian University (LMU) since 2000. He has also served as the director of the Department of Earth and Environmental Sciences, since its founding in 2002.

Awards and honours
Dingwell has been awarded the Arthur L. Day Medal of the Geological Society of America. In December 2019, the Governor General of Canada announced that Dingwell had been made an Officer of the Order of Canada. Dingwell was similarly made a Member of the Order of Newfoundland and Labrador in 2021.

In 2017 he became a member of the German Academy of Sciences Leopoldina.

In 2020 he was awarded the Arthur Holmes Medal by the European Geosciences Union

Select publications

References 

1958 births
Living people
Fellows of the American Association for the Advancement of Science
Fellows of the Royal Society of Canada
Academic staff of the Ludwig Maximilian University of Munich
Canadian geologists
Officers of the Order of Canada
Members of the Order of Newfoundland and Labrador
Recipients of the Cross of the Order of Merit of the Federal Republic of Germany
Members of the German Academy of Sciences Leopoldina